Fina Estampa (Looks & Essence) is a Brazilian telenovela that first aired on Globo between August 22, 2011 and March 23, 2012 in 185 chapters.

Synopsis
Set in Rio de Janeiro, Fina Estampa centers on Griselda, a tough, hard-working handywoman with a very well-defined set of values. She managed to raise her small children on her own when her husband disappeared. Now she lives with her three adult children and one grandson in a fancy neighborhood where she does odd jobs and is well-known and liked by everyone. However, her life is far from easy. Her daughter Maria Amália is hard-working like herself, but becomes involved with Rafael, a young man with dubious morals. Her son Quinzé was left by his wife, Teodora, who also left behind their small child. Her other son, Antenor, a medical student who is embarrassed by Griselda's humble ways, will do anything to keep her away from his life. He falls in love with Patrícia, the daughter of René, a renowned chef and restaurant owner, and Teresa Cristina, a vain, arrogant , unscrupulous woman whose favorite pastime is tormenting her nutty housekeeper, Crô. René is smitten with Griselda's simple but honorable approach to life, arousing jealousy in Teresa Cristina, who eventually becomes her biggest rival taking revenge to the next level with her manipulative ways. Tensions arise after Griselda wins the lottery and people suddenly turn up, like her "dead" husband, Pereirinha, and her son's ex-wife. She will have to face the excessive ambitions of her son, her rival, and ex-husband, among others.

Cast
 Lília Cabral as Griselda da Silva Pereira (Pereirão)
 Christiane Torloni as Tereza Cristina Buarque Siqueira de Velmont
 Dalton Vigh as Renê Velmont
 Carolina Dieckmann as Teodora Bastos da Silva
 Malvino Salvador as Quinzé (Joaquim José da Silva Pereira)
 Sophie Charlotte as Maria Amália da Silva Pereira
 Caio Castro as José Antenor da Silva Pereira
 Adriana Birolli as Patrícia Siqueira de Velmont
 Paulo Rocha as Guaracy Martins
 Marcelo Serrado as Crodoaldo Valério (Crô)
 Júlia Lemmertz as Esther Wolkoff Siqueira
 Renata Sorrah as Danielle Steiner Fraser
 Milena Toscano as Vanessa Tavares Ribas
 Eva Wilma as Maria Íris de Siqueira Maciel
 Arlete Salles as Vilma Moreira Prado
 Dira Paes as Celeste Souza Fonseca
 Alexandre Nero as Baltazar Fonseca
 Dudu Azevedo as Wallace Mu
 Marco Pigossi as Rafael Fernandes
 Cris Vianna as Dagmar dos Anjos
 Wolf Maya as Álvaro Siqueira
 Totia Meirelles as Zambeze Siqueira
 Guilherme Boury as Daniel
 Carlos Casagrande as Juan Guilherme Passarelli
 Tania Khalill as Letícia Fernandes Prado
 Suzana Pires as Marcela/Joana Coutinho
 Juliana Knust as Zuleika
 Thaís de Campos as Alice
 Mônica Carvalho as Glória Monteiro
 Monique Alfradique as Beatriz Lobo
 Ana Rosa as Celina
 Isabel Fillardis as Doctor Mônica Ramos
 Júlio Rocha as Enzo Pereira
 Carol Macedo as Solange de Souza Fonseca
 Carlos Machado as Ferdinand
 Joana Lerner as Luana
 Ricardo Blat as Severino
 Rafael Zulu as Edvaldo
 Eri Johnson as Gigante (Honório)
 Rosa Marya Colin as Zilá
 Guida Vianna as Isolina
 Michelle Martins as Fernanda
 Bianca Salgueiro as Carolina Fernandes Prado
 Luma Costa as Nanda
 Ana Carolina Dias as Deborah
 Ítalo Guerra as Reinaldo
 Alexandra Martins as Márcia
 David Lucas as Renê Velmont Júnior
 Guilherme Leicam as Fábio
 Vitor David as Leonardo dos Anjos
 Marcelo Brou as Pezão (Maurício)
 Christian Monassa as Max
 Sandro Pedroso as Mandrake
 Fábio Keldani as Victor
 Carlos Vieira as Fred
 Aline Matheus as Clara
 Ângela Vieira as Mirna Bello

Reception

Ratings

Awards and nominations

References

External links
 

2011 Brazilian television series debuts
2012 Brazilian television series endings
2011 telenovelas
TV Globo telenovelas
Brazilian telenovelas
Portuguese-language telenovelas
Television shows set in Rio de Janeiro (city)
Mixed martial arts mass media
Mixed martial arts television shows